The Permanent Mission of Armenia to NATO is the diplomatic mission of Armenia to the North Atlantic Treaty Organization (NATO). It is based in Brussels, Belgium.

History 

Armenia has maintained formal relations with NATO since 1992. Since then, Armenia has pursued developing closer Euro-Atlantic ties with the member states of NATO. In 2004, the Government of Armenia established a diplomatic mission to NATO, based in Brussels. The Mission of Armenia to NATO was established to further facilitate Armenia–NATO relations. Armenia is a member of the Euro-Atlantic Partnership Council, the Partnership for Peace programme, and maintains an Individual Partnership Action Plan (IPAP) with NATO.

During a meeting with the Secretary General of NATO Jens Stoltenberg, former Ambassador Gagik Hovhannisyan stated that Armenia is ready to continue developing close cooperation and partnership with NATO members.

Ambassador Arman Israelyan has stated, "Integration into European structures and development of relations with NATO is a priority of Armenia's foreign policy" and, "the final goal of reforms we are carrying out with the Alliance's help is to bring the Armenian army into line with NATO standards."

Ambassadors 
 In October 2017, Gagik Hovhannisyan was appointed the Permanent Representative of Armenia to NATO. 
 In May 2022, Arman Israelyan was appointed the Permanent Representative of Armenia to NATO.

See also 
 Armenian Atlantic Association
 Foreign relations of Armenia
 Information Centre on NATO in Armenia
 List of diplomatic missions of Armenia

References

External links 
 Official website
 Mission of Armenia to NATO on Twitter

NATO relations
Armenia
NATO